Peer-reviewed, scientific journals related to the study of globalization include the following:

 Antipode
 Development and Change
 Economic Geography
 Global Affairs
 Global Education Magazine
 Global Environmental Politics
 Global Governance: A Review of Multilateralism and International Organizations
 Global Health Action
 Global Policy
 Global Society
 Globalization and Health
 The Journal of Environment & Development
 Journal of Global History
 Journal of World History
 Journal of World-Systems Research
 Natural Resources Forum
 Public Culture
 World Development

 
Globalization
Journals